A gas turbine, also called a combustion turbine, is a type of continuous flow internal combustion engine. The main parts common to all gas turbine engines form the power-producing part (known as the gas generator or core) and are, in the direction of flow:
 a rotating gas compressor
 a combustor
 a compressor-driving turbine.

Additional components have to be added to the gas generator to suit its application. Common to all is an air inlet but with different configurations to suit the requirements of marine use, land use or flight at speeds varying from stationary to supersonic. A propelling nozzle is added to produce thrust for flight. An extra turbine is added to drive a propeller (turboprop) or ducted fan (turbofan) to reduce fuel consumption (by increasing propulsive efficiency) at subsonic flight speeds. An extra turbine is also required to drive a helicopter rotor or land-vehicle transmission (turboshaft), marine propeller or electrical generator (power turbine). Greater thrust-to-weight ratio for flight is achieved with the addition of an afterburner.

The basic operation of the gas turbine is a Brayton cycle with air as the working fluid: atmospheric air flows through the compressor that brings it to higher pressure; energy is then added by spraying fuel into the air and igniting it so that the combustion generates a high-temperature flow; this high-temperature pressurized gas enters a turbine, producing a shaft work output in the process, used to drive the compressor; the unused energy comes out in the exhaust gases that can be repurposed for external work, such as directly producing thrust in a turbojet engine, or rotating a second, independent turbine (known as a power turbine) that can be connected to a fan, propeller, or electrical generator. The purpose of the gas turbine determines the design so that the most desirable split of energy between the thrust and the shaft work is achieved. The fourth step of the Brayton cycle (cooling of the working fluid) is omitted, as gas turbines are open systems that do not reuse the same air.

Gas turbines are used to power aircraft, trains, ships, electrical generators, pumps, gas compressors, and tanks.

Timeline of development

50: Earliest records of Hero's engine (aeolipile). It most likely served no practical purpose, and was rather more of a curiosity; nonetheless, it demonstrated an important principle of physics that all modern turbine engines rely on.
1000: The "Trotting Horse Lamp" (zŏumădēng) was used by the Chinese at lantern fairs as early as the Northern Song dynasty. When the lamp is lit, the heated airflow rises and drives an impeller with horse-riding figures attached on it, whose shadows are then projected onto the outer screen of the lantern.
1500: The Smoke jack was drawn by Leonardo da Vinci: Hot air from a fire rises through a single-stage axial turbine rotor mounted in the exhaust duct of the fireplace and turns the roasting spit by gear-chain connection.
1629: Jets of steam rotated an impulse turbine that then drove a working stamping mill by means of a bevel gear, developed by Giovanni Branca.
1678: Ferdinand Verbiest built a model carriage relying on a steam jet for power.
1791: A patent was given to John Barber, an Englishman, for the first true gas turbine. His invention had most of the elements present in the modern day gas turbines. The turbine was designed to power a horseless carriage.
1861: British patent no. 1633 was granted to Marc Antoine Francois Mennons for a "Caloric engine". The patent shows that it was a gas turbine and the drawings show it applied to a locomotive.
1872: A gas turbine engine designed by Berlin engineer, Franz Stolze, is thought to be the first attempt at creating a working model, but the engine never ran under its own power.
1894: Sir Charles Parsons patented the idea of propelling a ship with a steam turbine, and built a demonstration vessel, the Turbinia, easily the fastest vessel afloat at the time. This principle of propulsion is still of some use.
1895: Three 4-ton 100 kW Parsons radial flow generators were installed in Cambridge Power Station, and used to power the first electric street lighting scheme in the city.
1899: Charles Gordon Curtis patented the first gas turbine engine in the US ("Apparatus for generating mechanical power", Patent No. US635,919).
1900: Sanford Alexander Moss submitted a thesis on gas turbines. In 1903, Moss became an engineer for General Electric's Steam Turbine Department in Lynn, Massachusetts. While there, he applied some of his concepts in the development of the turbosupercharger. His design used a small turbine wheel, driven by exhaust gases, to turn a supercharger.
1903: A Norwegian, Ægidius Elling, built the first gas turbine that was able to produce more power than needed to run its own components, which was considered an achievement in a time when knowledge about aerodynamics was limited. Using rotary compressors and turbines it produced 11 hp.
1906: The Armengaud-Lemale turbine engine in France with a water-cooled combustion chamber.
1910: Holzwarth impulse turbine (pulse combustion) achieved .
1913: Nikola Tesla patents the Tesla turbine based on the boundary layer effect.
1920s The practical theory of gas flow through passages was developed into the more formal (and applicable to turbines) theory of gas flow past airfoils by A. A. Griffith resulting in the publishing in 1926 of An Aerodynamic Theory of Turbine Design. Working testbed designs of axial turbines suitable for driving a propeller were developed by the Royal Aeronautical Establishment, thereby proving the efficiency of aerodynamic shaping of the blades in 1929.
1930: Having found no interest from the RAF for his idea, Frank Whittle patented the design for a centrifugal gas turbine for jet propulsion. The first successful use of his engine occurred in England in April 1937.
1932: BBC Brown, Boveri & Cie of Switzerland starts selling axial compressor and turbine turbosets as part of the turbocharged steam generating Velox boiler. Following the gas turbine principle, the steam evaporation tubes are arranged within the gas turbine combustion chamber; the first Velox plant was erected in Mondeville, Calvados, France.
1934: Raúl Pateras de Pescara patented the free-piston engine as a gas generator for gas turbines.
1936: Whittle with others backed by investment forms Power Jets Ltd
1937: Working proof-of-concept prototype jet engine runs in UK (Frank Whittle's) and Germany (Hans von Ohain's Heinkel HeS 1). Henry Tizard secures UK government funding for further development of Power Jets engine.
1939: First 4 MW utility power generation gas turbine from BBC Brown, Boveri & Cie. for an emergency power station in Neuchâtel, Switzerland.
1944: The Junkers Jumo 004 engine enters full production, powering the first German military jets such as the Messerschmitt Me 262. This marks the beginning of the reign of gas turbines in the sky.
1946: National Gas Turbine Establishment formed from Power Jets and the RAE turbine division to bring together Whittle and Hayne Constant's work. In Beznau, Switzerland the first commercial reheated/recuperated unit generating 27 MW was commissioned.
1947: A Metropolitan Vickers G1 (Gatric) becomes the first marine gas turbine when it completes sea trials on the Royal Navy's M.G.B 2009 vessel. The Gatric was an aeroderivative gas turbine based on the Metropolitan Vickers F2 jet engine. 
1995: Siemens becomes the first manufacturer of large electricity producing gas turbines to incorporate single crystal turbine blade technology into their production models, allowing higher operating temperatures and greater efficiency.
2011 Mitsubishi Heavy Industries tests the first >60% efficiency combined cycle gas turbine (the M501J) at its Takasago, Hyōgo, works.

Theory of operation 

In an ideal gas turbine, gases undergo four thermodynamic processes: an isentropic compression, an isobaric (constant pressure) combustion, an isentropic expansion and heat rejection. Together, these make up the Brayton cycle.

In a real gas turbine, mechanical energy is changed irreversibly (due to internal friction and turbulence) into pressure and thermal energy when the gas is compressed (in either a centrifugal or axial compressor). Heat is added in the combustion chamber and the specific volume of the gas increases, accompanied by a slight loss in pressure. During expansion through the stator and rotor passages in the turbine, irreversible energy transformation once again occurs. Fresh air is taken in, in place of the heat rejection.

If the engine has a power turbine added to drive an industrial generator or a helicopter rotor, the exit pressure will be as close to the entry pressure as possible with only enough energy left to overcome the pressure losses in the exhaust ducting and expel the exhaust. For a turboprop engine there will be a particular balance between propeller power and jet thrust which gives the most economical operation. In a turbojet engine only enough pressure and energy is extracted from the flow to drive the compressor and other components. The remaining high-pressure gases are accelerated through a nozzle to provide a jet to propel an aircraft.

The smaller the engine, the higher the rotation rate of the shaft must be to attain the required blade tip speed. Blade-tip speed determines the maximum pressure ratios that can be obtained by the turbine and the compressor. This, in turn, limits the maximum power and efficiency that can be obtained by the engine. In order for tip speed to remain constant, if the diameter of a rotor is reduced by half, the rotational speed must double. For example, large jet engines operate around 10,000–25,000 rpm, while micro turbines spin as fast as 500,000 rpm.

Mechanically, gas turbines can be considerably less complex than internal combustion piston engines. Simple turbines might have one main moving part, the compressor/shaft/turbine rotor assembly, with other moving parts in the fuel system. This, in turn, can translate into price. This, however, also translated into poor efficiency and reliability. More advanced gas turbines (such as those found in modern jet engines or combined cycle power plants) may have 2 or 3 shafts (spools), hundreds of compressor and turbine blades, movable stator blades, and extensive external tubing for fuel, oil and air systems; they use temperature resistant alloys, and are made with tight specifications requiring precision manufacture. All this often makes the construction of a simple gas turbine more complicated than a piston engine.

Moreover, to reach optimum performance in modern gas turbine power plants the gas needs to be prepared to exact fuel specifications. Fuel gas conditioning systems treat the natural gas to reach the exact fuel specification prior to entering the turbine in terms of pressure, temperature, gas composition, and the related wobbe-index.

The primary advantage of a gas turbine engine is its power to weight ratio. 
Since significant useful work can be generated by a relatively lightweight engine, gas turbines are perfectly suited for aircraft propulsion.

Thrust bearings and journal bearings are a critical part of a design. They are hydrodynamic oil bearings or oil-cooled rolling-element bearings. Foil bearings are used in some small machines such as micro turbines and also have strong potential for use in small gas turbines/auxiliary power units

Creep
A major challenge facing turbine design, especially turbine blades, is reducing the creep that is induced by the high temperatures and stresses that are experienced during operation. Higher operating temperatures are continuously sought in order to increase efficiency, but come at the cost of higher creep rates. Several methods have therefore been employed in an attempt to achieve optimal performance while limiting creep, with the most successful ones being high performance coatings and single crystal superalloys. These technologies work by limiting deformation that occurs by mechanisms that can be broadly classified as dislocation glide, dislocation climb and diffusional flow.

Protective coatings provide thermal insulation of the blade and offer oxidation and corrosion resistance. Thermal barrier coatings (TBCs) are often stabilized zirconium dioxide-based ceramics and oxidation/corrosion resistant coatings (bond coats) typically consist of aluminides or MCrAlY (where M is typically Fe and/or Cr) alloys. Using TBCs limits the temperature exposure of the superalloy substrate, thereby decreasing the diffusivity of the active species (typically vacancies) within the alloy and reducing dislocation and vacancy creep.
Bond coats are directly applied onto the surface of the substrate using pack carburization and serve the dual purpose of providing improved adherence for the TBC and oxidation resistance for the substrate. The Al from the bond coats forms Al2O3 on the TBC-bond coat interface which provides the oxidation resistance, but also results in the formation of an undesirable interdiffusion (ID) zone between itself and the substrate. The oxidation resistance outweighs the drawbacks associated with the ID zone as it increases the lifetime of the blade and limits the efficiency losses caused by a buildup on the outside of the blades.

Nickel-based superalloys boast improved strength and creep resistance due to their composition and resultant microstructure. The gamma (γ) FCC nickel is alloyed with aluminum and titanium in order to precipitate a uniform dispersion of the coherent  gamma-prime (γ') phases. The finely dispersed γ' precipitates impede dislocation motion and introduce a threshold stress, increasing the stress required for the onset of creep. Furthermore, γ' is an ordered L12 phase that makes it harder for dislocations to shear past it. Further Refractory elements such as rhenium and ruthenium can be added in solid solution to improve creep strength. The addition of these elements reduces the diffusion of the gamma prime phase, thus preserving the fatigue resistance, strength, and creep resistance. The development of single crystal superalloys has led to significant improvements in creep resistance as well. Due to the lack of grain boundaries, single crystals eliminate Coble creep and consequently deform by fewer modes – decreasing the creep rate. Although single crystals have lower creep at high temperatures, they have significantly lower yield stresses at room temperature where strength is determined by the Hall-Petch relationship. Care needs to be taken in order to optimize the design parameters to limit high temperature creep while not decreasing low temperature yield strength.

Types

Jet engines

Airbreathing jet engines are gas turbines optimized to produce thrust from the exhaust gases, or from ducted fans connected to the gas turbines. Jet engines that produce thrust from the direct impulse of exhaust gases are often called turbojets, whereas those that generate thrust with the addition of a ducted fan are often called turbofans or (rarely) fan-jets.

Gas turbines are also used in many liquid fuel rockets, where gas turbines are used to power a turbopump to permit the use of lightweight, low-pressure tanks, reducing the empty weight of the rocket.

Turboprop engines
A turboprop engine is a turbine engine that drives an aircraft propeller using a reduction gear. Turboprop engines are used on small aircraft such as the general-aviation Cessna 208 Caravan and Embraer EMB 312 Tucano military trainer, medium-sized commuter aircraft such as the Bombardier Dash 8 and large aircraft such as the Airbus A400M transport and the 60-year-old Tupolev Tu-95 strategic bomber.

Aeroderivative gas turbines

Aeroderivative gas turbines are generally based on existing aircraft gas turbine engines, and are smaller and lighter than industrial gas turbines.

Aeroderivatives are used in electrical power generation due to their ability to be shut down and handle load changes more quickly than industrial machines. They are also used in the marine industry to reduce weight. Common types include the General Electric LM2500, General Electric LM6000, and aeroderivative versions of the Pratt & Whitney PW4000 and Rolls-Royce RB211.

Amateur gas turbines
Increasing numbers of gas turbines are being used or even constructed by amateurs.

In its most straightforward form, these are commercial turbines acquired through military surplus or scrapyard sales, then operated for display as part of the hobby of engine collecting. In its most extreme form, amateurs have even rebuilt engines beyond professional repair and then used them to compete for the land speed record.

The simplest form of self-constructed gas turbine employs an automotive turbocharger as the core component. A combustion chamber is fabricated and plumbed between the compressor and turbine sections.

More sophisticated turbojets are also built, where their thrust and light weight are sufficient to power large model aircraft. The Schreckling design constructs the entire engine from raw materials, including the fabrication of a centrifugal compressor wheel from plywood, epoxy and wrapped carbon fibre strands.

Several small companies now manufacture small turbines and parts for the amateur. Most turbojet-powered model aircraft are now using these commercial and semi-commercial microturbines, rather than a Schreckling-like home-build.

Auxiliary power units
Small gas turbines are used as auxiliary power units (APUs) to supply auxiliary power to larger, mobile, machines such as an aircraft. They supply:
 compressed air for air conditioning and ventilation,
 compressed air start-up power for larger jet engines,
 mechanical (shaft) power to a gearbox to drive shafted accessories, and
 electrical, hydraulic and other power-transmission sources to consuming devices remote from the APU.

Industrial gas turbines for power generation

Industrial gas turbines differ from aeronautical designs in that the frames, bearings, and blading are of heavier construction. They are also much more closely integrated with the devices they power—often an electric generator—and the secondary-energy equipment that is used to recover residual energy (largely heat).

They range in size from portable mobile plants to large, complex systems weighing more than a hundred tonnes housed in purpose-built buildings. When the gas turbine is used solely for shaft power, its thermal efficiency is about 30%. However, it may be cheaper to buy electricity than to generate it. Therefore, many engines are used in CHP (Combined Heat and Power) configurations that can be small enough to be integrated into portable container configurations.

Gas turbines can be particularly efficient when waste heat from the turbine is recovered by a heat recovery steam generator (HRSG) to power a conventional steam turbine in a combined cycle configuration.
For 2018, GE offers its 826 MW HA at over 64% efficiency in combined cycle due to advances in additive manufacturing and combustion breakthroughs, up from 63.7% in 2017 orders and on track to achieve 65% by the early 2020s.
In March 2018, GE Power achieved a 63.08% gross efficiency for its 7HA turbine.

Aeroderivative gas turbines can also be used in combined cycles, leading to a higher efficiency, but it will not be as high as a specifically designed industrial gas turbine. They can also be run in a cogeneration configuration: the exhaust is used for space or water heating, or drives an absorption chiller for cooling the inlet air and increase the power output, technology known as turbine inlet air cooling.

Another significant advantage is their ability to be turned on and off within minutes, supplying power during peak, or unscheduled, demand. Since single cycle (gas turbine only) power plants are less efficient than combined cycle plants, they are usually used as peaking power plants, which operate anywhere from several hours per day to a few dozen hours per year—depending on the electricity demand and the generating capacity of the region. In areas with a shortage of base-load and load following power plant capacity or with low fuel costs, a gas turbine powerplant may regularly operate most hours of the day. A large single-cycle gas turbine typically produces 100 to 400 megawatts of electric power and has 35–40% thermodynamic efficiency.

Industrial gas turbines for mechanical drive
Industrial gas turbines that are used solely for mechanical drive or used in collaboration with a recovery steam generator differ from power generating sets in that they are often smaller and feature a dual shaft design as opposed to a single shaft. The power range varies from 1 megawatt up to 50 megawatts. These engines are connected directly or via a gearbox to either a pump or compressor assembly. The majority of installations are used within the oil and gas industries. Mechanical drive applications increase efficiency by around 2%.

Oil and gas platforms require these engines to drive compressors to inject gas into the wells to force oil up via another bore, or to compress the gas for transportation. They are also often used to provide power for the platform. These platforms do not need to use the engine in collaboration with a CHP system due to getting the gas at an extremely reduced cost (often free from burn off gas). The same companies use pump sets to drive the fluids to land and across pipelines in various intervals.

Compressed air energy storage

One modern development seeks to improve efficiency in another way, by separating the compressor and the turbine with a compressed air store. In a conventional turbine, up to half the generated power is used driving the compressor. In a compressed air energy storage configuration, power, perhaps from a wind farm or bought on the open market at a time of low demand and low price, is used to drive the compressor, and the compressed air released to operate the turbine when required.

Turboshaft engines

Turboshaft engines are used to drive compressors in gas pumping stations and natural gas liquefaction plants. They are also used to power all but the smallest modern helicopters. A primary shaft carries the compressor and its turbine which, together with a combustor, is called a Gas Generator. A separately-spinning power-turbine is usually used to drive the rotor on helicopters. Allowing the gas generator and power turbine/rotor to spin at their own speeds allows more flexibility in their design.

Radial gas turbines

Scale jet engines

Also known as miniature gas turbines or micro-jets.

With this in mind the pioneer of modern Micro-Jets, Kurt Schreckling, produced one of the world's first Micro-Turbines, the FD3/67. This engine can produce up to 22 newtons of thrust, and can be built by most mechanically minded people with basic engineering tools, such as a metal lathe.

Microturbines

Evolved from piston engine turbochargers, aircraft APUs or small jet engines, microturbines are 25 to 500 kilowatt turbines the size of a refrigerator.
Microturbines have around 15% efficiencies without a recuperator, 20 to 30% with one and they can reach 85% combined thermal-electrical efficiency in cogeneration.

External combustion
Most gas turbines are internal combustion engines but it is also possible to manufacture an external combustion gas turbine which is, effectively, a turbine version of a hot air engine.
Those systems are usually indicated as EFGT (Externally Fired Gas Turbine) or IFGT (Indirectly Fired Gas Turbine).

External combustion has been used for the purpose of using pulverized coal or finely ground biomass (such as sawdust) as a fuel. In the indirect system, a heat exchanger is used and only clean air with no combustion products travels through the power turbine. The thermal efficiency is lower in the indirect type of external combustion; however, the turbine blades are not subjected to combustion products and much lower quality (and therefore cheaper) fuels are able to be used.

When external combustion is used, it is possible to use exhaust air from the turbine as the primary combustion air. This effectively reduces global heat losses, although heat losses associated with the combustion exhaust remain inevitable.

Closed-cycle gas turbines based on helium or supercritical carbon dioxide also hold promise for use with future high temperature solar and nuclear power generation.

In surface vehicles

Gas turbines are often used on ships, locomotives, helicopters, tanks, and to a lesser extent, on cars, buses, and motorcycles.

A key advantage of jets and turboprops for airplane propulsion – their superior performance at high altitude compared to piston engines, particularly naturally aspirated ones – is irrelevant in most automobile applications. Their power-to-weight advantage, though less critical than for aircraft, is still important.

Gas turbines offer a high-powered engine in a very small and light package. However, they are not as responsive and efficient as small piston engines over the wide range of RPMs and powers needed in vehicle applications. In series hybrid vehicles, as the driving electric motors are mechanically detached from the electricity generating engine, the responsiveness, poor performance at low speed and low efficiency at low output problems are much less important. The turbine can be run at optimum speed for its power output, and batteries and ultracapacitors can supply power as needed, with the engine cycled on and off to run it only at high efficiency. The emergence of the continuously variable transmission may also alleviate the responsiveness problem.

Turbines have historically been more expensive to produce than piston engines, though this is partly because piston engines have been mass-produced in huge quantities for decades, while small gas turbine engines are rarities; however, turbines are mass-produced in the closely related form of the turbocharger.

The turbocharger is basically a compact and simple free shaft radial gas turbine which is driven by the piston engine's exhaust gas. The centripetal turbine wheel drives a centrifugal compressor wheel through a common rotating shaft. This wheel supercharges the engine air intake to a degree that can be controlled by means of a wastegate or by dynamically modifying the turbine housing's geometry (as in a variable geometry turbocharger).
It mainly serves as a power recovery device which converts a great deal of otherwise wasted thermal and kinetic energy into engine boost.

Turbo-compound engines (actually employed on some semi-trailer trucks) are fitted with blow down turbines which are similar in design and appearance to a turbocharger except for the turbine shaft being mechanically or hydraulically connected to the engine's crankshaft instead of to a centrifugal compressor, thus providing additional power instead of boost. While the turbocharger is a pressure turbine, a power recovery turbine is a velocity one.

Passenger road vehicles (cars, bikes, and buses)
A number of experiments have been conducted with gas turbine powered automobiles, the largest by Chrysler. More recently, there has been some interest in the use of turbine engines for hybrid electric cars. For instance, a consortium led by micro gas turbine company Bladon Jets has secured investment from the Technology Strategy Board to develop an Ultra Lightweight Range Extender (ULRE) for next-generation electric vehicles. The objective of the consortium, which includes luxury car maker Jaguar Land Rover and leading electrical machine company SR Drives, is to produce the world's first commercially viable – and environmentally friendly – gas turbine generator designed specifically for automotive applications.

The common turbocharger for gasoline or diesel engines is also a turbine derivative.

Concept cars

The first serious investigation of using a gas turbine in cars was in 1946 when two engineers, Robert Kafka and Robert Engerstein of Carney Associates, a New York engineering firm, came up with the concept where a unique compact turbine engine design would provide power for a rear wheel drive car. After an article appeared in Popular Science, there was no further work, beyond the paper stage.

Early concepts (1950s/60s)
In 1950, designer F.R. Bell and Chief Engineer Maurice Wilks from British car manufacturers Rover unveiled the first car powered with a gas turbine engine. The two-seater JET1 had the engine positioned behind the seats, air intake grilles on either side of the car, and exhaust outlets on the top of the tail. After being shown in the United Kingdom and the United States in 1950, JET1 was further developed, and was subjected to speed trials on the Jabbeke highway in Belgium in June 1952, where it exceeded . The car ran on petrol, paraffin (kerosene) or diesel oil, but fuel consumption problems proved insurmountable for a production car. JET1 is on display at the London Science Museum.

A French turbine-powered car, the SOCEMA-Grégoire, was displayed at the October 1952 Paris Auto Show. It was designed by the French engineer Jean-Albert Grégoire.

The first turbine-powered car built in the US was the GM Firebird I which began evaluations in 1953. While photos of the Firebird I may suggest that the jet turbine's thrust propelled the car like an aircraft, the turbine actually drove the rear wheels. The Firebird I was never meant as a commercial passenger car and was built solely for testing & evaluation as well as public relation purposes. Additional Firebird concept cars, each powered by gas turbines, were developed for the 1953, 1956 and 1959 Motorama auto shows. The GM Research gas turbine engine also was fitted to a series of transit buses, starting with the Turbo-Cruiser I of 1953.

Starting in 1954 with a modified Plymouth, the American car manufacturer Chrysler demonstrated several prototype gas turbine-powered cars from the early 1950s through the early 1980s. Chrysler built fifty Chrysler Turbine Cars in 1963 and conducted the only consumer trial of gas turbine-powered cars. Each of their turbines employed a unique rotating recuperator, referred to as a regenerator that increased efficiency.

In 1954 Fiat unveiled a concept car with a turbine engine, called Fiat Turbina. This vehicle, looking like an aircraft with wheels, used a unique combination of both jet thrust and the engine driving the wheels.

In the 1960s, Ford and GM also were developing gas turbine semi-trucks. Ford displayed the Big Red at the 1964 World's Fair. The cab boasted a highway map of the continental U.S., a mini-kitchen, bathroom, and a TV for the co-driver. The fate of the truck was unknown for several decades, but it was rediscovered in early 2021 in private hands, having been restored to running order. The Chevrolet division of GM built the Turbo Titan series of concept trucks with turbine motors as analogs of the Firebird concepts, including Turbo Titan I (shares GT-304 engine with Firebird II), Turbo Titan II (shares GT-305 engine with Firebird III), and Turbo Titan III (1965, GT-309 engine); in addition, the GM Bison gas turbine truck was shown at the 1964 World's Fair.

Emissions and fuel economy (1970s/80s)
As a result of the U.S. Clean Air Act Amendments of 1970, research was funded into developing automotive gas turbine technology. Design concepts and vehicles were conducted by Chrysler, General Motors, Ford (in collaboration with AiResearch), and American Motors (in conjunction with Williams Research). Long-term tests were conducted to evaluate comparable cost efficiency. Several AMC Hornets were powered by a small Williams regenerative gas turbine weighing  and producing  at 4450 rpm.

In 1982, General Motors used an Oldsmobile Delta 88 powered by a gas turbine using pulverised coal dust. This was considered for the United States and the western world to reduce dependence on middle east oil at the time

Toyota demonstrated several gas turbine powered concept cars, such as the Century gas turbine hybrid in 1975, the Sports 800 Gas Turbine Hybrid in 1979 and the GTV in 1985. No production vehicles were made. The GT24 engine was exhibited in 1977 without a vehicle.

Later development
In the early 1990s, Volvo introduced the Volvo ECC which was a gas turbine powered hybrid electric vehicle.

In 1993 General Motors introduced the first commercial gas turbine powered hybrid vehicle—as a limited production run of the EV-1 series hybrid. A Williams International 40 kW turbine drove an alternator which powered the battery-electric powertrain. The turbine design included a recuperator. In 2006, GM went into the EcoJet concept car project with Jay Leno.

At the 2010 Paris Motor Show Jaguar demonstrated its Jaguar C-X75 concept car. It uses Lithium-ion batteries to power four electric motors which combine to produce 780 bhp.

Racing cars

The first race car (in concept only) fitted with a turbine was in 1955 by a US Air Force group as a hobby project with a turbine loaned them by Boeing and a race car owned by Firestone Tire & Rubber company. The first race car fitted with a turbine for the goal of actual racing was by Rover and the BRM Formula One team joined forces to produce the Rover-BRM, a gas turbine powered coupe, which entered the 1963 24 Hours of Le Mans, driven by Graham Hill and Richie Ginther. American Ray Heppenstall joined Howmet Corporation and McKee Engineering together to develop their own gas turbine sports car in 1968, the Howmet TX, which ran several American and European events, including two wins, and also participated in the 1968 24 Hours of Le Mans. The cars used Continental gas turbines, which eventually set six FIA land speed records for turbine-powered cars.

For open wheel racing, 1967's revolutionary STP-Paxton Turbocar fielded by racing and entrepreneurial legend Andy Granatelli and driven by Parnelli Jones nearly won the Indianapolis 500; the Pratt & Whitney ST6B-62 powered turbine car was almost a lap ahead of the second place car when a gearbox bearing failed just three laps from the finish line. The next year the STP Lotus 56 turbine car won the Indianapolis 500 pole position even though new rules restricted the air intake dramatically. In 1971 Team Lotus principal Colin Chapman introduced the  Lotus 56B F1 car, powered by a Pratt & Whitney STN 6/76 gas turbine. Chapman had a reputation of building radical championship-winning cars, but had to abandon the project because there were too many problems with turbo lag.

Buses
General Motors fitted the GT-30x series of gas turbines (branded "Whirlfire") to several prototype buses in the 1950s and 1960s, including Turbo-Cruiser I (1953, GT-300); Turbo-Cruiser II (1964, GT-309); Turbo-Cruiser III (1968, GT-309); RTX (1968, GT-309); and RTS 3T (1972).

The arrival of the Capstone Turbine has led to several hybrid bus designs, starting with HEV-1 by AVS of Chattanooga, Tennessee in 1999, and closely followed by Ebus and ISE Research in California, and DesignLine Corporation in New Zealand (and later the United States). AVS turbine hybrids were plagued with reliability and quality control problems, resulting in liquidation of AVS in 2003. The most successful design by Designline is now operated in 5 cities in 6 countries, with over 30 buses in operation worldwide, and order for several hundred being delivered to Baltimore, and New York City.

Brescia Italy is using serial hybrid buses powered by microturbines on routes through the historical sections of the city.

Motorcycles
The MTT Turbine Superbike appeared in 2000 (hence the designation of Y2K Superbike by MTT) and is the first production motorcycle powered by a turbine engine – specifically, a Rolls-Royce Allison model 250 turboshaft engine, producing about 283 kW (380 bhp). Speed-tested to 365 km/h or 227 mph (according to some stories, the testing team ran out of road during the test), it holds the Guinness World Record for most powerful production motorcycle and most expensive production motorcycle, with a price tag of US$185,000.

Trains

Several locomotive classes have been powered by gas turbines, the most recent incarnation being Bombardier's JetTrain.

Tanks

The Third Reich Wehrmacht Heer's development division, the Heereswaffenamt (Army Ordnance Board), studied a number of gas turbine engine designs for use in tanks starting in mid-1944. The first gas turbine engine design intended for use in armored fighting vehicle propulsion, the BMW 003-based GT 101, was meant for installation in the Panther tank.

The second use of a gas turbine in an armored fighting vehicle was in 1954 when a unit, PU2979, specifically developed for tanks by C. A. Parsons and Company, was installed and trialed in a British Conqueror tank. The Stridsvagn 103 was developed in the 1950s and was the first mass-produced main battle tank to use a turbine engine, the Boeing T50. Since then, gas turbine engines have been used as auxiliary power units in some tanks and as main powerplants in Soviet/Russian T-80s and U.S. M1 Abrams tanks, among others. They are lighter and smaller than diesel engines at the same sustained power output but the models installed to date are less fuel efficient than the equivalent diesel, especially at idle, requiring more fuel to achieve the same combat range. Successive models of M1 have addressed this problem with battery packs or secondary generators to power the tank's systems while stationary, saving fuel by reducing the need to idle the main turbine. T-80s can mount three large external fuel drums to extend their range. Russia has stopped production of the T-80 in favor of the diesel-powered T-90 (based on the T-72), while Ukraine has developed the diesel-powered T-80UD and T-84 with nearly the power of the gas-turbine tank. The French Leclerc tank's diesel powerplant features the "Hyperbar" hybrid supercharging system, where the engine's turbocharger is completely replaced with a small gas turbine which also works as an assisted diesel exhaust turbocharger, enabling engine RPM-independent boost level control and a higher peak boost pressure to be reached (than with ordinary turbochargers). This system allows a smaller displacement and lighter engine to be used as the tank's power plant and effectively removes turbo lag. This special gas turbine/turbocharger can also work independently from the main engine as an ordinary APU.

A turbine is theoretically more reliable and easier to maintain than a piston engine since it has a simpler construction with fewer moving parts, but in practice, turbine parts experience a higher wear rate due to their higher working speeds. The turbine blades are highly sensitive to dust and fine sand so that in desert operations air filters have to be fitted and changed several times daily. An improperly fitted filter, or a bullet or shell fragment that punctures the filter, can damage the engine. Piston engines (especially if turbocharged) also need well-maintained filters, but they are more resilient if the filter does fail.

Like most modern diesel engines used in tanks, gas turbines are usually multi-fuel engines.

Marine applications

Naval 

Gas turbines are used in many naval vessels, where they are valued for their high power-to-weight ratio and their ships' resulting acceleration and ability to get underway quickly.

The first gas-turbine-powered naval vessel was the Royal Navy's Motor Gun Boat MGB 2009 (formerly MGB 509) converted in 1947. Metropolitan-Vickers fitted their F2/3 jet engine with a power turbine. The Steam Gun Boat Grey Goose was converted to Rolls-Royce gas turbines in 1952 and operated as such from 1953. The Bold class Fast Patrol Boats Bold Pioneer and Bold Pathfinder built in 1953 were the first ships created specifically for gas turbine propulsion.

The first large-scale, partially gas-turbine powered ships were the Royal Navy's Type 81 (Tribal class) frigates with combined steam and gas powerplants. The first,  was commissioned in 1961.

The German Navy launched the first  in 1961 with 2 Brown, Boveri & Cie gas turbines in the world's first combined diesel and gas propulsion system.

The Soviet Navy commissioned in 1962 the first of 25  with 4 gas turbines in Combined gas and gas propulsion system. Those vessels used 4 M8E gas turbines, which generated . Those ships were the first large ships in the world to be powered solely by gas turbines.

The Swedish Navy produced 6 Spica-class torpedo boats between 1966 and 1967 powered by 3 Bristol Siddeley Proteus 1282 turbines, each delivering . They were later joined by 12 upgraded Norrköping class ships, still with the same engines. With their aft torpedo tubes replaced by antishipping missiles they served as missile boats until the last was retired in 2005.

The Finnish Navy commissioned two  corvettes, Turunmaa and Karjala, in 1968. They were equipped with one  Rolls-Royce Olympus TM1 gas turbine and three Wärtsilä marine diesels for slower speeds. They were the fastest vessels in the Finnish Navy; they regularly achieved speeds of 35 knots, and 37.3 knots during sea trials. The Turunmaas were decommissioned in 2002. Karjala is today a museum ship in Turku, and Turunmaa serves as a floating machine shop and training ship for Satakunta Polytechnical College.

The next series of major naval vessels were the four Canadian  helicopter carrying destroyers first commissioned in 1972. They used 2 ft-4 main propulsion engines, 2 ft-12 cruise engines and 3 Solar Saturn 750 kW generators.

The first U.S. gas-turbine powered ship was the U.S. Coast Guard's , a cutter commissioned in 1961 that was powered by two  turbines utilizing controllable-pitch propellers. Since then, they have powered the U.S. Navy's s,  and s, and  guided missile cruisers. , a modified , is to be the Navy's first amphibious assault ship powered by gas turbines.
The marine gas turbine operates in a more corrosive atmosphere due to the presence of sea salt in air and fuel and use of cheaper fuels.

Civilian maritime 
Up to the late 1940s, much of the progress on marine gas turbines all over the world took place in design offices and engine builder's workshops and development work was led by the British Royal Navy and other Navies. While interest in the gas turbine for marine purposes, both naval and mercantile, continued to increase, the lack of availability of the results of operating experience on early gas turbine projects limited the number of new ventures on seagoing commercial vessels being embarked upon.

In 1951, the Diesel-electric oil tanker Auris, 12,290 deadweight tonnage (DWT) was used to obtain operating experience with a main propulsion gas turbine under service conditions at sea and so became the first ocean-going merchant ship to be powered by a gas turbine. Built by Hawthorn Leslie at Hebburn-on-Tyne, UK, in accordance with plans and specifications drawn up by the Anglo-Saxon Petroleum Company and launched on the UK's Princess Elizabeth's 21st birthday in 1947, the ship was designed with an engine room layout that would allow for the experimental use of heavy fuel in one of its high-speed engines, as well as the future substitution of one of its diesel engines by a gas turbine. The Auris operated commercially as a tanker for three-and-a-half years with a diesel-electric propulsion unit as originally commissioned, but in 1951 one of its four  diesel engines – which were known as "Faith", "Hope", "Charity" and "Prudence" – was replaced by the world's first marine gas turbine engine, a  open-cycle gas turbo-alternator built by British Thompson-Houston Company in Rugby. Following successful sea trials off the Northumbrian coast, the Auris set sail from Hebburn-on-Tyne in October 1951 bound for Port Arthur in the US and then Curacao in the southern Caribbean returning to Avonmouth after 44 days at sea, successfully completing her historic trans-Atlantic crossing. During this time at sea the gas turbine burnt diesel fuel and operated without an involuntary stop or mechanical difficulty of any kind. She subsequently visited Swansea, Hull, Rotterdam, Oslo and Southampton covering a total of 13,211 nautical miles. The Auris then had all of its power plants replaced with a  directly coupled gas turbine to become the first civilian ship to operate solely on gas turbine power.

Despite the success of this early experimental voyage the gas turbine did not replace the diesel engine as the propulsion plant for large merchant ships. At constant cruising speeds the diesel engine simply had no peer in the vital area of fuel economy. The gas turbine did have more success in Royal Navy ships and the other naval fleets of the world where sudden and rapid changes of speed are required by warships in action.

The United States Maritime Commission were looking for options to update WWII Liberty ships, and heavy-duty gas turbines were one of those selected. In 1956 the John Sergeant was lengthened and equipped with a General Electric  HD gas turbine with exhaust-gas regeneration, reduction gearing and a variable-pitch propeller. It operated for 9,700 hours using residual fuel (Bunker C) for 7,000 hours. This gave the ship a speed capability of 18 knots, up from 11 knots with the original power plant, and well in excess of the 15 knot targeted. The ship made its first transatlantic crossing with an average speed of 16.8 knots, in spite of some rough weather along the way. Suitable Bunker C fuel was only available at limited ports because the quality of the fuel was of a critical nature. The fuel oil also had to be treated on board to reduce contaminants and this was a labor-intensive process that was not suitable for automation at the time. Ultimately, the variable-pitch propeller, which was of a new and untested design, ended the trial, as three consecutive annual inspections revealed stress-cracking. This did not reflect poorly on the marine-propulsion gas-turbine concept though, and the trial was a success overall. The success of this trial opened the way for more development by GE on the use of HD gas turbines for marine use with heavy fuels. The John Sergeant was scrapped in 1972 at Portsmouth PA.

Boeing launched its first passenger-carrying waterjet-propelled hydrofoil Boeing 929, in April 1974. Those ships were powered by two Allison 501-KF gas turbines.

Between 1971 and 1981, Seatrain Lines operated a scheduled container service between ports on the eastern seaboard of the United States and ports in northwest Europe across the North Atlantic with four container ships of 26,000 tonnes DWT. Those ships were powered by twin Pratt & Whitney gas turbines of the FT 4 series. The four ships in the class were named Euroliner, Eurofreighter, Asialiner and Asiafreighter. Following the dramatic Organization of the Petroleum Exporting Countries (OPEC) price increases of the mid-1970s, operations were constrained by rising fuel costs. Some modification of the engine systems on those ships was undertaken to permit the burning of a lower grade of fuel (i.e., marine diesel). Reduction of fuel costs was successful using a different untested fuel in a marine gas turbine but maintenance costs increased with the fuel change. After 1981 the ships were sold and refitted with, what at the time, was more economical diesel-fueled engines but the increased engine size reduced cargo space.

The first passenger ferry to use a gas turbine was the GTS Finnjet, built in 1977 and powered by two Pratt & Whitney FT 4C-1 DLF turbines, generating  and propelling the ship to a speed of 31 knots. However, the Finnjet also illustrated the shortcomings of gas turbine propulsion in commercial craft, as high fuel prices made operating her unprofitable. After four years of service, additional diesel engines were installed on the ship to reduce running costs during the off-season. The Finnjet was also the first ship with a Combined diesel-electric and gas propulsion. Another example of commercial use of gas turbines in a passenger ship is Stena Line's HSS class fastcraft ferries. The slightly smaller HSS 900-class Stena Carisma, uses twin ABB–STAL GT35 turbines rated at  gross. The Stena Discovery was withdrawn from service in 2007, another victim of too high fuel costs.

In July 2000 the Millennium became the first cruise ship to be powered by both gas and steam turbines. The ship featured two General Electric LM2500 gas turbine generators whose exhaust heat was used to operate a steam turbine generator in a COGES (combined gas electric and steam) configuration. Propulsion was provided by two electrically driven Rolls-Royce Mermaid azimuth pods. The liner  uses a combined diesel and gas configuration.

In marine racing applications the 2010 C5000 Mystic catamaran Miss GEICO uses two Lycoming T-55 turbines for its power system.

Advances in technology
Gas turbine technology has steadily advanced since its inception and continues to evolve. Development is actively producing both smaller gas turbines and more powerful and efficient engines. Aiding in these advances are computer-based design (specifically computational fluid dynamics and finite element analysis) and the development of advanced materials: Base materials with superior high-temperature strength (e.g., single-crystal superalloys that exhibit yield strength anomaly) or thermal barrier coatings that protect the structural material from ever-higher temperatures. These advances allow higher compression ratios and turbine inlet temperatures, more efficient combustion and better cooling of engine parts.

Computational fluid dynamics (CFD) has contributed to substantial improvements in the performance and efficiency of gas turbine engine components through enhanced understanding of the complex viscous flow and heat transfer phenomena involved. For this reason, CFD is one of the key computational tools used in design and development of gas turbine engines.

The simple-cycle efficiencies of early gas turbines were practically doubled by incorporating inter-cooling, regeneration (or recuperation), and reheating. These improvements, of course, come at the expense of increased initial and operation costs, and they cannot be justified unless the decrease in fuel costs offsets the increase in other costs. The relatively low fuel prices, the general desire in the industry to minimize installation costs, and the tremendous increase in the simple-cycle efficiency to about 40 percent left little desire for opting for these modifications.

On the emissions side, the challenge is to increase turbine inlet temperatures while at the same time reducing peak flame temperature in order to achieve lower NOx emissions and meet the latest emission regulations. In May 2011, Mitsubishi Heavy Industries achieved a turbine inlet temperature of 1,600 °C on a 320 megawatt gas turbine, and 460 MW in gas turbine combined-cycle power generation applications in which gross thermal efficiency exceeds 60%.

Compliant foil bearings were commercially introduced to gas turbines in the 1990s. These can withstand over a hundred thousand start/stop cycles and have eliminated the need for an oil system. The application of microelectronics and power switching technology have enabled the development of commercially viable electricity generation by microturbines for distribution and vehicle propulsion.

Advantages and disadvantages 

The following are advantages and disadvantages of gas-turbine engines:

Advantages include:

 Very high power-to-weight ratio compared to reciprocating engines.
 Smaller than most reciprocating engines of the same power rating.
 Smooth rotation of the main shaft produces far less vibration than a reciprocating engine.
 Fewer moving parts than reciprocating engines results in lower maintenance cost and higher reliability/availability over its service life.
 Greater reliability, particularly in applications where sustained high power output is required.
 Waste heat is dissipated almost entirely in the exhaust. This results in a high-temperature exhaust stream that is very usable for boiling water in a combined cycle, or for cogeneration.
 Lower peak combustion pressures than reciprocating engines in general.
 High shaft speeds in smaller "free turbine units", although larger gas turbines employed in power generation operate at synchronous speeds.
 Low lubricating oil cost and consumption.
 Can run on a wide variety of fuels.
 Very low toxic emissions of CO and HC due to excess air, complete combustion and no "quench" of the flame on cold surfaces.

Disadvantages include:

 Core engine costs can be high due to use of exotic materials.
 Less efficient than reciprocating engines at idle speed.
 Longer startup than reciprocating engines.
 Less responsive to changes in power demand compared with reciprocating engines.
 Characteristic whine can be hard to suppress.

Major manufacturers

 Siemens 
 Ansaldo 
 Mitsubishi Heavy 
 Rolls-Royce
 General Electric
 Silmash
 ODK
 Pratt & Whitney
 P&W Canada
 Solar Turbines
 Alstom
 Zorya-Mashproekt
 MTU Aero Engines
 MAN Turbo
 IHI Corporation
 Kawasaki Heavy
 HAL
 BHEL
 MAPNA
 Techwin
 Doosan Heavy
 Shanghai Electric
 Harbin Electric
 AECC

Testing
British, German, other national and international test codes are used to standardize the procedures and definitions used to test gas turbines. Selection of the test code to be used is an agreement between the purchaser and the manufacturer, and has some significance to the design of the turbine and associated systems. In the United States, ASME has produced several performance test codes on gas turbines. This includes ASME PTC 22–2014. These ASME performance test codes have gained international recognition and acceptance for testing gas turbines. The single most important and differentiating characteristic of ASME performance test codes, including PTC 22, is that the test uncertainty of the measurement indicates the quality of the test and is not to be used as a commercial tolerance.

See also 
 List of aircraft engines
 Centrifugal compressor
 Gas turbine modular helium reactor
 Pneumatic motor
 Pulsejet
 Steam turbine
 Turbine engine failure
 Wind turbine

References

Further reading
 Stationary Combustion Gas Turbines including Oil & Over-Speed Control System description
"Aircraft Gas Turbine Technology" by Irwin E. Treager, McGraw-Hill, Glencoe Division, 1979, .
"Gas Turbine Theory" by H.I.H. Saravanamuttoo, G.F.C. Rogers and H. Cohen, Pearson Education, 2001, 5th ed., .

R. M. "Fred" Klaass and Christopher DellaCorte, "The Quest for Oil-Free Gas Turbine Engines," SAE Technical Papers, No. 2006-01-3055, available at sae.org
"Model Jet Engines" by Thomas Kamps  Traplet Publications
Aircraft Engines and Gas Turbines, Second Edition by Jack L. Kerrebrock, The MIT Press, 1992, .
 "Forensic Investigation of a Gas Turbine Event" by John Molloy, M&M Engineering
"Gas Turbine Performance, 2nd Edition" by Philip Walsh and Paul Fletcher, Wiley-Blackwell, 2004

External links

Technology Speed of Civil Jet Engines
MIT Gas Turbine Laboratory 
MIT Microturbine research
California Distributed Energy Resource guide – Microturbine generators
Introduction to how a gas turbine works from "how stuff works.com" 
Aircraft gas turbine simulator for interactive learning
An online handbook on stationary gas turbine technologies compiled by the US DOE. 

 
Engines
Marine propulsion